WFAS may refer to:

WFAS (AM), a radio station (1230 AM) licensed to serve White Plains, New York, United States
WVBN (FM), a radio station (103.9 FM) licensed to serve Bronxville, New York, which has held the call sign WFAS-FM in three separate periods
Windows Firewall with Advanced Security